A list of notable visual artists who were either born on the Isle of Man, or are known for their work on the Isle of Man.

The list
Rayner Hoff (1894–1937), Manx-born sculptor moved to Australia aged 28
William Hoggatt (1879–1961), artist who moved to the Isle of Man in 1907
Bryan Kneale RA (born 1930, Douglas), prize-winning sculptor, now lives in London
Archibald Knox (1864–1933), a designer with an interest in Celtic art
Paul Lewthwaite (born 1969, Douglas), a sculptor
Baillie Scott (1865–1945), artist and architect who studied on the IOM and lived there for 12 years

See also
 List of residents of the Isle of Man

References

Isle of Man
Artists
Artists
Manx artists